Cha cha cha may refer to:
 Cha-cha-chá (music), a style of Cuban dance music
 Cha-cha-cha (dance), a Latin American dance accompanying the music

Film and television
 Cha Cha Cha (film), a 2013 Italian crime film
 Cha Cha Cha (1964 film), a 1964 Indian film
 Cha Cha Cha (TV series), a TV show from Argentina
 Cha Cha Cha Films, a film production company

Music
 Cha Cha Cha (album), a 1995 album by EMF
 Cha Cha Cha, 1955 album by Monchito and the Mambo Royals
 Cha Cha Cha, 1982 album by Anne Linnet Band
 Cha Cha Cha, 1977 album by Irwin Goodman
 Cha Cha Cha, 2014 album by Abelardo Barroso
 "Cha Cha Cha" (MC Lyte song), 1989
 "Cha Cha Cha" (Käärijä song), 2023, the Finnish entry in the Eurovision Song Contest 2023
 "The Bear Cha Cha Cha", a song from Bear in the Big Blue House
 "The Cha-Cha-Cha", a 1962 song by Bobby Rydell
 "Cha Cha Cha", by The Little Ones, 2006

Other
 Cha Cha Cha Township, a shopping centre in rural Zimbabwe
 ChaChaCha, a team playing  format in golf

See also 
 Cha-Cha (disambiguation)